Ifereimi Tawake (born 21 September 1962 in Sigatoka) is a Fijian former rugby union footballer and coach of Sacramento Mountain Lions. He played as flanker and lock.

Career
His first cap for Fiji was against Wales, at Suva, on 31 May 1986. Although having not taking part at the 1987 Rugby World Cup, he took part to the 1991 and 1999 World Cups, where in the former, he played 3 matches, while in the latter, he played 2 matches. He retired from the international career after the pool stage match against England at Twickenham on 20 October 1999.

Coaching career
In 2001, he replaced Greg Smith as caretaker coach for the Flying Fijians until he was replaced in 2002 by Mac McCallion. He also coached clubs like Coastal Stallions, Western Crusaders, Northern Sharks, Fiji Barbarians, Fiji Warriors. From 2013 he coached the Sacramento Mountain Lions.

Notes

External links

People from Sigatoka
Fijian rugby union coaches
Fijian rugby union players
Rugby union flankers
Rugby union locks
1962 births
Living people
Fijian expatriates in the United States
I-Taukei Fijian people
Fiji international rugby union players